Richard Sperry Yeoman (born Richard S. Yeo; August 15, 1904 – November 9, 1988)  was an American commercial artist and coin collector who marketed coin display boards for Whitman Publishing. Hired by that company in 1932, he redesigned the boards in 1940 to the fold-out model that is currently sold.

Career
He is best known for compiling two authoritative coin price guides, A Handbook of United States Coins (also known as the "Blue Book", published in 1942) and A Guide Book of United States Coins (or the "Red Book" or The Official Red Book), first published in 1946. Yeoman also wrote A Catalogue of Modern World Coins in 1957 also known as the "brown book", where his Yeoman numbering system was popularly accepted. Whitman bought the rights to Coins of the World Catalogues from the estate of Wayte Raymond. As the size reached a theoretical limit, the foreign series was split off into a second book. Yeoman wrote Current Coins of the World as the second in that series.

R. S. Yeoman retired in 1970, and was succeeded by his assistant, Kenneth Bressett. Yeoman (with Bressett) is still listed as the author of each edition of the books.

Yeoman served on the American Numismatic Association Board of Governors starting in 1946, and in 1964 was a member of the United States Assay Commission.

Later life
After his retirement, Yeoman continued to travel to coin conventions, particularly the annual American Numismatic Association National Money Show and World's Fair of Money.

Yeoman died from a stroke while driving in Tucson, Arizona on November 9, 1988. He is buried at West Lawn Memorial Park in Mount Pleasant, Wisconsin.

Personal life
Yeoman married Marion Junkerman in 1925.

Awards and honors
Yeoman received the Farran Zerbe Memorial Award, the highest honor bestowed by the American Numismatic Association, in 1956.

References

External links
Whitman history

1904 births
1988 deaths
20th-century American  historians
American numismatists